Enge is a village in Põhja-Pärnumaa Parish, Pärnu County in southwestern Estonia.

Enge is the birthplace of actor Mart Toome.

References

 

Villages in Pärnu County
Kreis Pernau